Margaret A. Noodin is an American poet and Anishinaabemowin language teacher. She is Professor of English and American Indian Studies at the University of Wisconsin–Milwaukee.

Education
Noodin holds an MFA in Creative Writing and a PhD in English and Linguistics, both received at the University of Minnesota. Her doctoral dissertation is titled Native American Literature in tribal context: Anishinaabe Aadisokaanag Noongom (2001).

Life and career
Noodin has contributed to the ojibwe.net website. She led a weekly Ojibwe language group at the University of Michigan-Ann Arbor, where she served as Director of Comprehensive Studies.

She is the author of Bawaajimo: A Dialect of Dreams in Anishinaabe Language and Literature (2014) and Weweni: Poems in Anishinaabemowin and English (2015).
With her daughters, she belongs to a women's hand drum group, Miskwaasining Nagamojig (the Swamp Singers), which sings in Anishinaabemowin.

Works

Dissertation

Articles and essays

Noodin, Margaret with James Price and Tracy Boyer (2020). "Challenges and Opportunities for Nonmarket Valuation of Water Among the Anishinaabe Nations of the Great Lakes Basin" with James Price and Tracy Boyer in The Solutions Journal, vol 11, issue 2, online.

Books
 
 
 
Gijigijigaaneshiinh Gikendaan: What the Chickadee Knows. Made in Michigan Writers Series. Wayne State University Press. 2015. ISBN 978-0814347508

In anthology
 
Erdrich, Heid, ed. (2018). New Poets of Native Nations. Graywolf Press. .
LaPensee, Elizabeth, ed. (2019). Sovereign Traces. volume 2: Relational Constellation. Michigan State University Press. .

Poetry online

References

Further reading

External links 

, narrated by Noodin
Minowakiing: The Good Land | Margaret Noodin | TEDxUWMilwaukee
Poetry Foundation: Margaret Noodin

1965 births
Living people
21st-century American poets
21st-century American women writers
American women academics
American women poets
University of Michigan people
University of Minnesota alumni
University of Wisconsin–Milwaukee faculty